The 2012 season was Seongnam Ilhwa Chunma's twenty-fourth season in the K-League in South Korea. Seongnam Ilhwa Chunma is competing K-League, Korean FA Cup and AFC Champions League.

Current squad

Out on loan

Transfer

In

Out

Coaching staff

Match results

K-League
All times are Korea Standard Time (KST) – UTC+9

League table

Results summary

Results by round

Korean FA Cup

AFC Champions League

Group stage (Group G)

Knockout stage

Friendly tournament

Asian Challenge Cup

Squad statistics

Appearances
Statistics accurate as of match played 27 June 2012

Goals and assists

Discipline

References

Seongnam Ilhwa Chunma
2012